Omphalotropis cheynei is a species of minute salt marsh snail with an operculum, a terrestrial gastropod mollusk, or micromollusk, in the family Assimineidae. This species is endemic to Palau.

References

Fauna of Palau
Omphalotropis
Assimineidae
Endemic fauna of Palau
Gastropods described in 1862
Taxonomy articles created by Polbot